Margistrombus is a genus of sea snails, marine gastropod mollusks in the family Strombidae, the true conchs.

Species
Species within the genus Margistrombus include:
 Margistrombus marginatus (Linnaeus, 1758)
 Margistrombus robustus (G.B. Sowerby III, 1875)
 Margistrombus septimus (Duclos, 1844)
 Margistrombus simanoki Liverani, 2013
 Margistrombus succinctus (Linnaeus, 1767)
Species brought into synonymy
 Margistrombus boucheti Thach, 2016: synonym of Margistrombus robustus (G. B. Sowerby III, 1875)

References

 Bandel K. (2007) About the larval shell of some Stromboidea, connected to a review of the classification and phylogeny of the Strombimorpha (Caenogastropoda). Freiberger Forschungshefte, ser. C 524: 97-206.
 Dekkers A.M. (2008). Revision of the family Strombidae (Gastropoda)on the supraspecific level. Part One. De Kreukel. 44(3): 35-64.
 Liverani V. (2014) The superfamily Stromboidea. Addenda and corrigenda. In: G.T. Poppe, K. Groh & C. Renker (eds), A conchological iconography. pp. 1-54, pls 131-164. Harxheim: Conchbooks. 

Strombidae